Croatia, following its independence, made its Paralympic Games début at the 1992 Summer Paralympics in Barcelona, sending three competitors in swimming, two in shooting and one in track and field. The latter, Milka Milinković, won Croatia's first Paralympic medal, and its only medal of the 1992 Games - a bronze in the women's javelin (THW5 category).

Croatia has taken part in every subsequent edition of the Summer Paralympics. It first participated in the Winter Paralympics in 2002, with two representatives in alpine skiing, and has entered every edition of the Winter Games since then.

Croatians have won a total of twenty-eight Paralympic medals, of which six gold, eight silver and fourteen bronze. Twenty-six of these medals have been won at the Summer Games, in track and field, swimming, table tennis and taekwondo. And with the exception of Milinković's early bronze, all have been won from 2004 games onwards. At the Winter Games Croatia has won two medals, gold in alpine skiing and bronze in snowboarding.

Medal tables

Medals by Summer Games

Medals by Winter Games

Medals by summer sport

Medals by winter sport

List of medalists

Summer sports

Winter sports

List of flag bearers

Multiple medal winners
The following list only contains medal winners for Croatia as an independent country.

See also
 Croatia at the Olympics

References